Blad al-Mulayki is a sub-district located in Al Udayn District, Ibb Governorate, Yemen. Blad al-Mulayki had a population of 10193 as of 2004.

References 

Sub-districts in Al Udayn District